Stéphanie Vanden Borre (born 14 September 1997) is a Belgian field hockey player for the Belgian national team.

In January 2014, she made her debut for the Belgian national hockey team during a series of friendly matches against the South African team. With the Belgian team, Vanden Borre won silver at the European Championship in 2017 and bronze in 2021.

She participated at the 2018 Women's Hockey World Cup.

References

External links 

 
 

1997 births
Living people
Belgian female field hockey players
Female field hockey defenders